Mount Bross is a high mountain summit in the Mosquito Range of the Rocky Mountains of North America. Mount Bross is named in honor of William Bross, who owned property in the area.

Geography
With a topographic prominence in the range of 292 to 332 feet (89 to 101 m), Mount Bross barely qualifies as an independent peak by the standard 300 foot prominence rule.  It is often climbed together with Mount Lincoln and nearby Mount Democrat.

In 2005, the summit of Mount Bross was closed to the public because of safety concerns related to mines and trail access through private land.

See also

List of mountain peaks of Colorado
List of Colorado fourteeners

References

External links

Mount Bross on 14ers.com
Mount Bross on Listsofjohn.com
Mount Bross on Peakery.com
Mount Bross on Summitpost

Mountains of Colorado
Mountains of Park County, Colorado
Pike National Forest
Fourteeners of Colorado
North American 4000 m summits